Below is a list of audio dramas based on properties of Marvel Comics. This list includes radio dramas, podcasts, and rock operas.

See also 
List of television series based on Marvel Comics publications
List of films based on Marvel Comics publications
Marvel Games
List of novels based on Marvel Comics publications
List of Marvel RPG supplements

References 

American radio dramas
Comic book podcasts
Science fiction podcasts
Works based on Marvel Comics
American podcasts
Radio dramas based on Marvel Comics
Marvel Comics-related lists